Cristiada may refer to:
 Cristiada, an armed uprising in Mexico; see Cristero War
 Cristiada (film), a film about the uprising